Guemes or Güemes may refer to:
 De Güemes, a Spanish surname
 Guemes Island, a small island in western Skagit County, Washington state, USA
 General Güemes, Salta, a town in the center of the province of Salta, Argentina
 General Güemes Department, Chaco, the largest and the northernmost department of Chaco Province in Argentina
 General Güemes Department, Salta, Salta Province, Argentina
 Martín Miguel de Güemes, Argentine 19th century military leader